Dixie Kay Nelson (August 15, 1933August 23, 2020), known professionally as Lori Nelson, was an American actress and model mostly active in the 1950s and early 1960s. She had roles in the TV series How to Marry a Millionaire and the films Revenge of the Creature, All I Desire, and I Died a Thousand Times.

Early life
Born Dixie Kay Nelson in Santa Fe, New Mexico, Nelson was the daughter of Mr. and Mrs. R. A. Nelson. Her father was superintendent of the American Metal Mine Company in Tererro, New Mexico. She was the great-grandniece of John J. Pershing. She began her career at the age of two, appearing in local theater productions. When she was four years old, her family moved to Encino, California. At the age of five, she won the title of "Little Miss America". During her childhood, she toured veterans' hospitals entertaining patients, acted in productions of little theaters, and modeled for photographers.

At age seven, Nelson contracted rheumatic fever which left her bedridden for four years. After she recovered, she returned to pageants and won the title of Miss Encino at age 17. After graduating from Canoga Park High School, Nelson worked as a model.

Career
In 1950, she was signed to a seven-year contract with Universal-International after a studio scout saw her performing in a little theater production.
She made her film debut in the 1952 Western Bend of the River. Later that year, she appeared as "Rosie Kettle" in the comedy film Ma and Pa Kettle at the Fair, followed by a supporting role in Francis Goes to West Point. In 1955, Nelson guest starred in two episodes of It's a Great Life, and reprised her role as "Rosie Kettle" in Ma and Pa Kettle at Waikiki. That same year, she co-starred in the Creature From the Black Lagoon sequel Revenge of the Creature and Underwater! with Jane Russell and Richard Egan.

Her supporting roles in films included the low-budget sci-fi story Day the World Ended (1955), directed by Roger Corman, and a big-budget Paramount Pictures comedy-Western, Pardners, starring Martin and Lewis in one of their final films together. Nelson had a featured role in I Died a Thousand Times, a 1955 remake of High Sierra, as well as in 1954's Destry, a remake of Destry Rides Again.

She was one of the leads in an 18th-century adventure story Mohawk. Nelson had top billing in the street-racing film Hot Rod Girl, also starring Chuck Connors, and the following year she co-starred opposite Mamie Van Doren as law-breakers sentenced to work on a "punishment" farm in Untamed Youth.

In November 1957, Nelson co-starred with Van Johnson in the TV movie The Pied Piper of Hamelin, which aired as a Thanksgiving Day special. Also in 1957, she was cast in one of the three lead roles in the syndicated sitcom How to Marry a Millionaire. Based on the 1953 film of the same name, Nelson starred as Greta Hanson, a brainy psychology major who works as an usher on a television game show. The series also starred Barbara Eden and Merry Anders. Nelson opted to leave the series after the first season, and her character was written out.

After leaving the series, Nelson continued with guest roles on Wagon Train, Tales of Wells Fargo, The Tab Hunter Show, Bachelor Father, and Armstrong Circle Theatre. She took a 10-year break from acting in 1961 and returned with a guest role in Family Affair in 1971. Dramatically Nelson worked sporadically thereafter. She made only three on-screen appearances in the 1990s, including a role in the direct-to-video release Mom, Can I Keep Her? (1998). Her last role was in the 2005 low-budget science fiction horror film The Naked Monster, in which she reprised her role from Revenge of the Creature.

Personal life

Relationships
In the early 1950s, Nelson dated actor Tab Hunter. The relationship was fodder for gossip columnists at the time, and there was speculation that the two would marry. In his 2005 autobiography Tab Hunter Confidential: The Making of a Movie Star, Hunter admitted he considered marrying Nelson but was struggling to come to terms with his true sexuality. While Hunter was dating Nelson, he was secretly involved with figure skater Ronald Robertson. Nelson and Hunter eventually stopped dating but remained friendly. Hunter later cast Nelson in two guest-starring roles on his sitcom The Tab Hunter Show.

Marriages and children
On December 10, 1960, Nelson married composer and singing group leader Johnny Mann in Los Angeles. The couple had two daughters, then divorced in April 1973. In April 1983, Nelson married police officer Joseph J. Reiner.

Death
Nelson died on August 23, 2020, at her home in Porter Ranch, Los Angeles. She was 87. She suffered from Alzheimer's disease for several years before her death.

Filmography
Sources:

References

Works cited
 Hunter, Tab; Muller, Eddie (2005). Tab Hunter Confidential: The Making of a Movie Star. Algonquin Books.

External links

 
 

1933 births
2020 deaths
20th-century American actresses
21st-century American actresses
Actresses from California
Actresses from New Mexico
American child actresses
American female models
American film actresses
American stage actresses
American television actresses
American people of English descent
American people of German descent
People from Encino, Los Angeles
Actresses from Santa Fe, New Mexico